Pseudopezus binigromaculatus is a species of beetle in the family Cerambycidae, and the only species in the genus Pseudopezus. It was described by Breuning in 1969.

References

Ancylonotini
Beetles described in 1969
Monotypic beetle genera